Elderflower pressé is a sweetened, carbonated soft drink. It is made from elderflowers, the flowers of the European elderberry,  Sambucus nigra, which are also used to make elderflower cordial, or a synthetic equivalent. Other ingredients will include lemons and sweetener.

Elderflower pressé is therefore similar to citron pressé and lemonade, and effectively a premixed form of elderflower cordial. Like them, it is used as a mixer in cocktails.

References

External links
 BBC GoodFood Recipe Retrieved 2011-06-23.

Soft drinks
Lemonade
Drink mixers
Non-alcoholic drinks